The British Rail Class 231 is a class of eleven diesel-electric multiple units of the FLIRT family, which have been built for Transport for Wales by Swiss rolling stock manufacturer Stadler Rail. The first units entered service on 18 January 2023.

History
The previous Wales & Borders rail franchise operator, KeolisAmey Wales ordered the new trains. Although KeolisAmey was removed as the franchise operator and replaced by an operator of last resort Transport for Wales Rail, owned by the Welsh Government, the scheduled full fleet replacement continued.

The units began testing in Switzerland in July 2021 and in November 2021 the first two units were delivered to Cardiff Canton depot.

Operators

Transport for Wales

Technical details
Class 231 units have four passenger vehicles, along with a separate "Power Pack" vehicle at the centre of the unit that contains four diesel generator sets. The diesel generators comply with EU Stage V emissions regulations. All vehicles are linked by unpowered Jacobs bogies, while the outermost bogie at each end of each unit carries the traction motors.

Fleet details

Individual vehicles are numbered as follows, with the last two digits of each vehicle number matching those of the unit to which the vehicle belongs:

European Vehicle Numbers for the fleet are devised by prefixing the domestic vehicle number with type code 95, country code 70, and a leading zero; "95700...".

Illustration

Notes

References

External links

231
Stadler Rail multiple units
Train-related introductions in 2023